The Cornet is a peak on the south side of Pardo Ridge between Muckle Bluff and The Stadium. Located on Elephant Island in the South Shetland Islands of Antarctica, it was named descriptively for its conical shape by the UK Joint Services Expedition, 1970-71.

References

 

Mountains of the South Shetland Islands